HD 233731, or HAT-P-22, is a suspected multiple star system in the northern circumpolar constellation of Ursa Major. It is invisible to the naked eye, having an apparent visual magnitude of 9.732. This system is located at a distance of 267 light years from the Sun based on parallax, and is drifting further away with a radial velocity of +13 km/s.

The stellar classification of the primary is G5V, matching an ordinary G-type main-sequence star. The star has a low level of stellar activity with an estimated age of 9 to 12 billion years old. Its metallicity is twice that of the Sun, unusual for its advanced age. HD 233731 has a similar mass and radius as the Sun, and is spinning with a rotation period of 28.7 days. It is radiating 77% of the luminosity of the Sun from its photosphere at an effective temperature of 5314 K.

Planetary system
In 2010 a transiting hot Jupiter like planet was detected, designated HAT-P-22b.

In 2017, analysis of additional HARPS data showed a long-term trend that suggested the presence of an additional orbiting companion, HAT-P-22c.

References

G-type main-sequence stars
Planetary systems with one confirmed planet
Planetary transit variables
Ursa Major (constellation)
J10224361+5007420
233731